Stanisław Kaczor-Batowski (1866–1946) was a Polish realist and romanticist painter. Born in Lwów (then Lemberg in Austro-Hungarian Galicia, now Lviv, Ukraine), in 1885 he graduated from the Kraków-based Academy of Fine Arts. A student of Florian Cynk and Władysław Łuszczkiewicz, he moved to Vienna and then Munich, where he studied under the tutelage of Alexander von Liezen-Mayer between 1887 and 1889. He also spent a brief time in Paris and Rome before returning to his natal Lwów, where he spent the rest of his life. In the years 1903-1914 he ran his own painting school in Lviv.

A fan of Henryk Sienkiewicz, Juliusz Słowacki and Jan Matejko, Kaczor-Batowski specialized in historicist paintings, usually related to Poland's martial history. Among the best known of his works is the Polish Thermopylae (Battle of Zadwórze) and Pułaski at Savannah  The last painting is currently owned and permanently displayed at The Polish Museum in Chicago. He is also notable as the designer of the stuccos and frescoes for the Grand Theatre in Lwów (modern Theatre of Lviv). In addition to painted landscapes, portraits and religious paintings, Batowski made a series of illustrations for "Trilogy" by Henryk Sienkiewicz.

Gallery

External links

Webart Entry
Works

References

1866 births
1946 deaths
Artists from Lviv
19th-century Polish painters
19th-century Polish male artists
20th-century Polish painters
20th-century Polish male artists
Polish male painters